Neil R. Powe is an American professor of medicine at the University of California, San Francisco and the chief of medicine at the Zuckerberg San Francisco General Hospital and Trauma Center. Previously he was professor of medicine at the Johns Hopkins University School of Medicine. His research has mainly related to kidney disease, cardiovascular disease and health disparities.

Biography 
Neil R. Powe attended Central High School and is an alumnus in the school's Hall of Fame. He earned a bachelor's degree in biochemistry from Princeton University, a medical degree at Harvard Medical School and a master’s in public health at Harvard School of Public Health. He completed residency in internal medicine, was a Robert Wood Johnson Clinical Scholar and completed a master’s in business administration at the University of Pennsylvania.   

In 1986 Powe joined the faculty of Johns Hopkins University School of Medicine and the Bloomberg School of Public Health, where he became the James F. Fries University distinguished professor.

In 2020, he co-authored a paper on the implications of removing race adjustment in kidney function calculations.

Awards and honors 
Fellow in the American Association for the Advancement of Science
Diversity Award - Association of Professors of Medicine
John M. Eisenberg Award for Career Achievement in Research - Society of General Internal Medicine
Distinguished Educator Award - Association for Clinical Research Training
Belding Scribner Award - American Society of Nephrology

Selected publications
 (Co-author)
 (Co-author)
 (Co-author)
 (Co-author)

References

Year of birth missing (living people)
Living people
UCSF School of Medicine faculty
Johns Hopkins Bloomberg School of Public Health faculty
Princeton University alumni
Harvard School of Public Health alumni
Harvard Medical School alumni
Members of the National Academy of Medicine